The South Wales Police and Crime Commissioner is the police and crime commissioner, an elected official tasked with setting out the way crime is tackled by South Wales Police in the "South Wales region" defined by the police force as the seven local authorities of Bridgend, Cardiff, Merthyr Tydfil, Neath Port Talbot, Rhondda Cynon Taf, Swansea and Vale of Glamorgan. The post was created in November 2012, following an election held on 15 November 2012, and replaced the South Wales Police Authority. The current incumbent is former Assembly First Secretary Alun Michael, who represents the Labour Party.

List of North Wales Police and Crime Commissioners

Police and crime commissioners in Wales